Rectaflex was the world's first series produced Pentaprism single lens reflex camera. It was produced from 1948 to 1958. Rectaflex was the only Italian single-lens reflex camera ever built.
There has been some uncertainty about the Rectaflex being first or second pentaprism SLR to be produced. Marco Antonettos very thorough research in 2002 clarified that the Rectaflex was the first.

Original Rectaflex 

The Rectaflex was a 35mm SLR camera with a Focal-plane shutter, interchangeable lenses and a pentaprism eye-level finder. It was the world's first SLR equipped with a pentaprism, with a final presentation in April 1948, and start of series production in September the same year, thus hitting the market one year before the Contax S, presented in 1949.

It also had a wide diameter bayonet mount and a Rapid Return Mirror. The chief designer was Telemaco Corsi.

The first prototype of the Rectaflex, presented at the Milano Fiera in April 1947, was a wooden mock-up, with a mirror eye-level finder, giving a left to right inverted image. For vertical pictures, the image was upside down, and that was a big drawback. This was corrected with a roof prism before the 1948 Milano show, and the preseries model was called Rectaflex Standard 947, and had a fully working pentaprism as well as a focal plane shutter from 1s to 1/1000, synchronised at 1/25.

The first production model was the Rectaflex series A 1000 (serial number 1000 to 2150), quite similar to the preseries model. The Rectaflex series B 2000 (s/n some 2150 to 2999) added a split image device in the focusing screen and had no film cutter. Note that Rectaflex series A 1000 and Rectaflex series B 2000 were not official designations, but a way to recognize the variants by way of their serial number.

The B 3000 series was produced from June 1949, and was numbered from 3001 to some 3970.

The Rectaflex series B 4000 (s/n 4001 to some 4500) had  a modified A/R lever. The Rectaflex series B 16000 (s/n 16001 to 16870) had a triple sync plug and a film reminder under the rewind knob. The Rectaflex series B 20000 (s/n 20101 to 20300) had an internally modified shutter and a reinforced bayonet mount. This was only a test series.

The Rectaflex series 25000 (s/n 25000 to 29500) was produced from December 1952 and had a modified shutter to 1/1300, and two sync plugs only. From s/n 29500 to 31500 it was called 30000 series and had a new flattened release button. These two last series are sometimes called Rectaflex 1300, because of its shutter speed, the previous series being called Rectaflex 1000. Production in Rome ended early 1955.

Special variants 
The Rectaflex Junior was a Rectaflex series 1000 transformed with a simplified focal plane shutter from 1/25 to 1/500. The Rectaflex series 1000 had reliability trouble, so an important number (between 500 and 1000) were converted.

The Rectaflex Gold was a Rectaflex series 25000 with gold-plated finish and lizard body covering. All were given as presents to VIPs, among which the Pope Pius XII, Dwight D. Eisenhower and Winston Churchill.

The Rectaflex Rotor was a Rectaflex series 25000 with a three-lens turret. The estimated production was 200 to 300. In addition, some Rectaflex from various series were independently converted to the Rectaflex Rotor specifications.

A special version of the Rectaflex series 25000 existed with 24x32 format and a microscope adapter, for scientific use.

Rectaflex Liechtenstein 
After the Rectaflex 30000 the original Rectaflex company went down, and a new Rectaflex company was formed, partly controlled by the Prince of Liechtenstein. Telemaco Corsi did not play any role in it. In 1956 they launched a Rectaflex 40000, often called Rectaflex Liechtenstein. It had a reshaped pentaprism cover, with the Liechtenstein blason, and other minor changes. The number produced was less than 200 and it seemed to be plagued by design faults. Some prototypes are known with internal diaphragm preselection. None of the Liechtenstein cameras were ever sold, and the company went down in 1958.

The Recta 
The Recta was a prototype rangefinder camera based on the Rectaflex. It had a focal plane shutter from 1s to 1/1000 and a 39mm Leica mount. Six were produced, with serial number 1001 to 1006. The known standard lens was the Isco Westar 50/3.5.

The Recta was designed by Telemaco Corsi in 1953, before the demise of Rectaflex.

Rectamatic 
The Rectamatic was the project of an advanced 35 mm SLR camera, designed by Telemaco Corsi at the beginning of the 1960s, as a successor of the Rectaflex.

Rectaflex lenses 
 Dallmeyer Dalrac 13.5 cm/4.5, chrome with black mount (sold at lp-foto auction #4)
 Zeiss Biotar 1:1.5 f=7.5 cm (for Rectaflex, Serial #2688858 available at sh photo)

References

 Crescenzi, Luigi (2005). Italian Cameras.  Retrieved December 16, 2005
 Antonetto, Marco (2002): "Rectaflex, the Magic Reflex". Nassa Watch Gallery 2002.

External links
 Rectaflex, la reflex magica / the magic reflex (Italiano / English)
 http://www.pentax-slr.com/Rectaflex

SLR cameras
Photography companies of Italy